Jiangqiao (江桥) may refer to:

Jiangqiao Mongol Ethnic Town, Tailai County, Heilongjiang, China
Resistance at Nenjiang Bridge, battle of the Second Sino-Japanese War which occurred in the above town
Jiangqiao Campaign, campaign of the Second Sino-Japanese War which occurred in the above town
Jiangqiao, Shanghai, town in Jiading District, Shanghai, China

zh:江桥